Serra Macaense Futebol Clube, usually known as Serra Macaense, is a  team from the city of Macaé, Rio de Janeiro state, founded on December 29, 1992. It was formerly known as Independente Esportes Clube Macaé.

History
The club was founded as Independente Esportes Clube Macaé on December 29, 1992. The club was sold in 2010 and renamed Serra Macaense Futebol Clube.

Titles
Campeonato Carioca Módulo Especial: 2000

Colors
The official colors are sky blue and black.

Club kits
The home kit is a sky blue and black striped jersey, black shorts and black socks. The away kit is white with details in black and sky blue.

References

External links
Independente Esportes Clube Macaé at FFERJ

Association football clubs established in 1992
Association football clubs established in 2004
Football clubs in Rio de Janeiro (state)
1992 establishments in Brazil
2004 establishments in Brazil